Sancho d'Avila (21 September 1523 – 1583) was a Spanish general.

Born at Ávila, he first served as the commander of the Duke of Alba's bodyguard. It was in this function that d'Avila arrested the Count of Egmont.

When the Eighty Years' War started, d'Avila suffered a defeat in the Battle of Le Quesnoy. He was also involved in the 1572 Siege of Middelburg and the Battle of Flushing a year later. In 1574, d'Avila defeated Louis and Henry, brothers of William the Silent, in the Battle of Mookerheyde.

In 1576, as commander of the Spanish troops in the Citadel of Antwerp, he was the main instigator of the Sack of Antwerp in which some 7,000 lives and a great deal of property were lost. Four years later, he participated with the Duke of Alba at the Battle of Alcântara. d'Avila died at Lisbon of a wound infection, during a raid in Portugal.

1523 births
1583 deaths
People from Ávila, Spain
Spanish generals
Military personnel of the Spanish Netherlands